Lamida obscura is a species of snout moth in the genus Lamida. It was described by Frederic Moore in 1888, and is known from India (including Sikkim), China (including Canton), Taiwan and Japan.

The wingspan is 12–13 mm.

References

Moths described in 1888
Epipaschiinae
Moths of Asia
Moths of Japan
Moths of Taiwan